Kim Tae-pyung (born September 25, 1982), better known as Hyun Bin, is a South Korean actor. He gained widespread recognition for his role in the 2005 romantic comedy TV drama My Name is Kim Sam-soon. Since then, he has appeared in leading roles in other successful television shows, including the romantic fantasy drama Secret Garden (2010–2011), fantasy drama Memories of the Alhambra (2018–2019), and romantic drama Crash Landing on You (2019–2020). Hyun Bin's popularity was further widened by starring in a series of box office hits: the action thriller Confidential Assignment (2017) and its 2022 sequel, as well as the crime thrillers The Swindlers (2017) and The Negotiation (2018). He was Gallup Korea's Television Actor of the Year in 2011. The success of Hyun Bin's works internationally established him as a top Hallyu star. He is among the highest paid and most influential actors in South Korea.

Hyun drew praise from critics for his performance in melodrama film Late Autumn, which was screened at the 61st Berlin International Film Festival. Throughout his television and film career, he has been nominated for several iconic awards, including five at the Baeksang Arts Awards, and won various accolades for his acting recognition, including the Grand Prize (Daesang) for TV at the 47th Baeksang Arts Awards.

Career

2003–2007: Career beginnings and rise to stardom

Hyun Bin's first film was Shower in 2002. However, filming was stopped and was not released due to lack of proper funding.  Hyun eventually made his debut as an actor in the 2003 television series Bodyguard. He then starred in the sitcom Nonstop 4 and quirky romance drama Ireland, and made his film debut the same year in the youth sports film Spin Kick.

Hyun shot to stardom with the 2005 romantic comedy TV series My Lovely Sam Soon with Kim Sun-a, for which Hyun won the Top Excellence Award at the MBC Drama Awards. My Lovely Sam Soon was a massive hit with average viewership ratings of over 37% and recorded 50.5% for the finale, making it one of the highest-rated Korean drama of all time. The explosive popularity of the drama and his portrayal as Sam-sik established Hyun Bin as a top star in South Korea and a Hallyu star as his popularity expanded beyond South Korea to Japan and other countries in Asia.

Following the success of My Lovely Sam Soon, Hyun starred in lead role in his first film A Millionaire's First Love (written by internet novelist Guiyeoni). The film was a hit with the young audience. Hyun's next television project, The Snow Queen, although underperformed, earned him his first Best Actor nomination at Baeksang Arts Awards.

2008–2011: New career challenges and Secret Garden
To expand his acting profile, Hyun started to choose more eclectic projects. In 2008, he acted in director Yoon Jong-chan's film I Am Happy, playing Man-soo, a man who suffers from mental illnesses. The film was selected to screen at the 13th Busan International Film Festival in 2008, but it was not released in theatres until late 2009. After The Snow Queen, Hyun returned to television with Worlds Within, which was well-received for Noh Hee-kyung's writing. He was praised for his nuanced acting in the drama series. In 2009, Hyun drew critical acclaim with his portrayal as a sociopath in the gangster saga Friend, Our Legend. To prepare for his role, he reportedly watched Kwak Kyung-taek's original film 20 to 30 times.

In 2010, Hyun starred in Secret Garden, a romantic fantasy drama written by Kim Eun-sook. The drama recorded its highest viewership ratings of 35%, and gained enormous popularity both domestically and internationally for its fashion, catchphrases and music. His portrayal as Kim Joo-won created a "Hyun Bin Syndrome" as his name and face were plastered everywhere, from newspapers to television and the internet. Hyun was recognized at the 2010 SBS Drama Awards and the 47th Baeksang Arts Awards for his stellar performance. He also contributed to the soundtrack of the drama with "That Man", which peaked at number one in eight Korean music portals.

In 2011, Hyun appeared in two films that were released back to back; Come Rain, Come Shine, a minimalist breakup indie directed by Lee Yoon-ki, and Late Autumn directed by Kim Tae-yong. Shot in Seattle, Late Autumn is an English-language remake of the 1966 Lee Man-hee classic, in which Hyun played a man on the run who falls in love with a woman who is on special leave from prison (Chinese actress Tang Wei). He received a good review from The Hollywood Reporter which stated, "It is Hyun who impresses more for not underplaying the dandy, narcissistic side of his personality." Hyun walked the red carpet at the 61st Berlin International Film Festival, where the two films were both selected to be screened. He described the honor as his "most happiest achievement".

2011–2012: Military enlistment and discharge
On March 7, 2011, Hyun began his 21-month mandatory military service as a soldier in the Marine Corps. He volunteered to serve in the Marine Corps, said to be the toughest branch of the Korean military, as he had a good impression of the Marines. Competition rate to enter the Marines at that time was high at 4:1 with Hyun placing in the top 5% of applicants. Hyun applied to be a combat soldier. The decision to join the Marines while at the peak of his career generated much interest in Korea and overseas.  Seven broadcasting companies, including Japan's NHK, requested access to the training camp. Hyun was named a top marksman during training, one of 16 out of about 720 rookie Marines. Hyun hit the target 19 times out of 20 in day shooting training, and all of his 10 shots hit the target during night training. To qualify as a top marksman, rookies must hit the target more than 18 times out of 20 in day training and nine out of 10 at night.

The Corps originally planned to put Hyun on public relations duty; however due to public criticism and Hyun's reported desire to serve on the front line, Hyun was assigned on active duty to Baengnyeong Island, close to the Northern Limit Line and Yeonpyeong, site of a November 2010 artillery engagement between the North and South Korean forces.

After joining the Marines and completing his six months in the service, Hyun participated in the "Seoul Reclamation Anniversary Marine Marathon Competition". He ran a 6.25 km long course with 400 exemplary senior marines. This event was held in remembrance of the historically significant event when the Marines won back the capital Seoul that had been taken during the 6.25 Korean War.

He was discharged on December 6, 2012, and was awarded the Secretary of Defense Award and the Marine Corps Commandant Commendation for being an exemplary soldier. After the merger of their former agency AM Entertainment with SM Entertainment, Hyun's reps announced in November 2012 that the actor and Shin Min-ah had decided to go independent and set up their own management agency O& Entertainment.

2013–2016: Comeback to entertainment industry

Hyun spent most of 2013 shooting ad commercials as an in-demand product endorser, and holding fan meetings all over Asia. For his acting comeback after military service, Hyun chose The Fatal Encounter, his first ever period film, in which he played the leading role of King Jeongjo who faced fierce party strife and assassination attempts during his reign. It was released in April 2014 and drew more than 3 million admissions. However, Hyun was criticized for his flat tonation and lack of emotions in the film, which received mostly negative reviews.

In 2015, Hyun made a comeback in the Korean drama scene after 4 years with romantic comedy series Hyde, Jekyll, Me. In the drama inspired by the literary character, he plays a man with split personality disorder whose two personas both fall for the same woman.

In January 2016, Hyun set up his own agency, VAST Entertainment, which became a wholly owned subsidiary of Kakao M three years later.

2017–present: Career resurgence
Hyun returned to silver screen with the action-thriller film titled Confidential Assignment (2017), where he plays the role of a North Korean detective that is secretly sent to South Korea to apprehend a crime ring that is made up of North Korean traitors. The film was a success, and Hyun received positive reviews from critics for his action scenes and comedic performance. He then starred in crime action film The Swindlers, along with Yoo Ji-tae, about a prosecutor who plans to catch a con man who has swindled a large sum of money. The Swindlers was another box office hit for Hyun.

In 2018, Hyun starred in crime thriller The Negotiation, playing a villain role for the first time, alongside Son Ye-jin; and zombie blockbuster Rampant (which was co-produced by VAST Entertainment).
The same year, he returned to the small screen with fantasy suspense drama Memories of the Alhambra alongside Park Shin-hye. The series is one of highest rated Korean drama in cable television history, and Hyun was praised for his seemingly indifferent but humorous depiction of his character.

In 2019, Hyun reunited with The Negotiation co-star Son Ye-jin in the hit romance drama Crash Landing on You as a North Korean army captain. The drama was a huge success and is the third-highest-rated Korean drama in cable television history, and Hyun was praised for his versatile range of emotions and acting skills.
For his portrayal as Captain Ri Jeong Hyuk as a North Korean elite army officer, Hyun won Grand Prize at APAN Star Awards.
In 2020, Hyun is set to star as a NIS agent in the action thriller film  The Point Men, directed by Yim Soon-rye.

Philanthropy
On October 29, 2013, Hyun received the President's award at the 50th Savings Day held by the Financial Services Committee, for saving 35 billion won (approximately US$33 million) within 17 years. In February 2016, Hyun was involved in an awareness campaign against animal cruelty. As part of the project, Hyun's agency VAST Entertainment released pictures of him posing with a retired search and rescue dog named "Vision".

In March 2020, it was revealed that Hyun made a secret donation of 200 million won to the non-profit organization, Community Chest of Korea, to help fight against the COVID-19 outbreak on February 21, 2020. Hyun is also included as a member in the "Honor Society", a group of major private donors, for his many donations to different causes. He has continually supported projects by organizations such as Save the Children, Community Chest of Korea and international relief NGOs.

On March 8, 2022, Hyun made a donation  million to the Hope Bridge Disaster Relief Association, together with Son Ye-jin to help those who have been damaged by the massive wildfire that started in Uljin, Gyeongbuk and has continued to spread Samcheok, Gangwon.

Personal life
Hyun was born and raised in Seoul and has one elder brother. He graduated from Youngdong High School and studied at Chung-Ang University, where he majored in Theater Studies in 2004. In 2009, he enrolled at the same university to obtain a Master's degree.

On January 1, 2021, Hyun's agency confirmed that he had been in a relationship with actress Son Ye-jin, his co-star in The Negotiation (2018) and Crash Landing on You (2019–2020), since the year prior, after Crash Landing on You concluded. On February 10, 2022, Hyun and Son announced their engagement in letters posted on their social media accounts. They married in a private ceremony on March 31, attended by their parents and friends of both families. On June 27, Son announced that she is pregnant with the couple's first child, and she gave birth to a son on November 27.

Filmography

Film

Television series

Television show

Music video appearances

Discography

Ambassadorship

Awards and nominations

State honors

Listicles

Notes

References

External links

 
 
 

Living people
1982 births
21st-century South Korean male actors
21st-century South Korean male singers
Chung-Ang University alumni
Republic of Korea Marine Corps personnel
South Korean male film actors
South Korean male television actors
Male actors from Seoul